Jean-Philippe "J. P." Bergeron is a Canadian professional stock car racing driver. He currently competes part-time in the ARCA Menards Series, driving the No. 46 Ford Fusion for David Gilliland Racing.

Racing career

Early years 
Bergeron would get his start at the age of 13, racing go-karts. In 2015, he would compete in the Cup Lites Series in Canada, winning Rookie of the Year. In 2017, he would first compete in the ACT Late Model Tour, with him winning Rookie of the Year in 2018. In 2019, he would sign with the Prolon Racing Team with the help from his dad. In 2021, it was announced that he would drive in the RS1 Cup Series for Avion Motorsports.

ARCA Menards Series 
Bergeron would sign with David Gilliland Racing for three race, with two ARCA Menards Series races and one ARCA Menards Series West race. He would first make his debut with David Gilliland Racing at the 2021 Sioux Chief PowerPEX 200, finishing eighth. He would achieve a top 5 at the next race, finishing 5th at the 2021 Reese's 150. He would garner another top 5 finish in his ARCA Menards Series West debut, also finishing fifth.

Personal life 
His father, Marc, owns the Prolon Racing Team, which helps field Jean-Philippe.

Motorsports career results

Pinty's Series

ARCA Menards Series

ARCA Menards Series West

References

External links 

1999 births
Living people
ARCA Menards Series drivers
NASCAR drivers
Racing drivers from Quebec
Sportspeople from Quebec